Wilhelm Schlüter (1828– 25 April 1919) was a German natural history dealer. 

Wilhelm Schlüter was the proprietor of das Naturwissenschaftliche Institut - Naturalien und Lehrmittelhandlung in Halle an der Saale. He sold many important bird and insect collections to museums and private collections. He also supplied specimens, equipment and books to universities. He was associated with the ornithologists Otto Kleinschmidt, Oscar Rudolph Neumann and August Carl Eduard Baldamus and sold bird specimens collected by Herbert and Bruno Geisler in New Guinea, by Gustav Schrader in the Near East and by Carl Constantin Platen in China and South East Asia.

A subspecies of lizard, Ophisops elegans schlueteri, is named in his honor. An African ant Polyrhachis schlueteri is also named for him.

References

Further reading
Schmidt R (1919). "Nachruf Wilhelm Schlüter ". Z. f. Ornithol. Oologie 24: 7-10.

External links
zfmk
Zobodat

German entomologists
German ornithologists
1828 births
1919 deaths